Emmanuel "Manu" Pluton is a French former competitive bodybuilder, film actor, and pornographic actor.

Bodybuilding career
Pluton's most successful year in bodybuilding was 1965 when he won the contests of Mr. France (Tall category and Overall) and Europe Mr. Apollo (Tall category and overall). He also participated in NABBA Amateur Mr. Universe the same year, with the 6th place in the Tall category.

Pornographic film career
Pluton started appearing in cinema films by 1971 with Jacques Scandelari's Beyond Love and Evil. Various minor roles followed and he was cast in Serge Korber's 1975 pornographic films Love Play (L'Essayeuse) and Growing Up (Dans la chaleur de Julie). Pluton continued performing in pornographic films, particularly in those directed by Korber until 1977. His scene in Éric de Winter's sadomasochistic and controversial Maléfices pornos, which was produced in 1976 but could only be screened by 1978, was deemed as "racist" according to an opinion of the censorship board.

In the United States
Pluton moved to the United States by the early 1980s and, becoming the NABBA Southern California Chairman, won the Masters National Championship in 1982.

References

External links

1942 births
Living people
People from Fort-de-France
Martiniquais male bodybuilders
French people of Martiniquais descent
French male film actors
French male pornographic film actors
Martiniquais emigrants to the United States